P102 may refer to:

Vessels 
 , a patrol boat of the Mexican Navy
 , a defense boat of the Nigerian Navy
 , a patrol boat of the Timor Leste Defence Force

Other uses 
 Papyrus 102, a biblical manuscript
 P102, a a state regional road in Latvia